Scutelleridae is a family of true bugs. They are commonly known as jewel bugs or metallic shield bugs due to their often brilliant coloration. They are also known as shield-backed bugs due to the enlargement of the thoracic scutellum into a continuous shield over the abdomen and wings. This latter characteristic distinguishes them from most other families within Heteroptera, and may lead to misidentification as a beetle rather than a bug. These insects feed on plant juices from a variety of different species, including some commercial crops. Closely related to stink bugs, they may also produce an offensive odour when disturbed. There are around 450 species worldwide.

Description
They can easily be distinguished from stink bugs (Pentatomidae) because the shield-like enlarged last section of their thorax (known as the scutellum, Latin for "little shield") completely covers the abdomen and the wings.

Despite their resemblance to beetles, jewel bugs are hemipterans or true bugs. The scutellum is an extension of the thorax, unlike the elytra of beetles which are hardened forewings. As such, jewel bugs have four membranous wings underneath the scutellum in contrast to two in beetles. The scutellum in jewel bugs also does not have a division in the middle and thus does not 'split open' when they take flight like in beetles.

The heads of jewel bugs are triangular and the antennae have three to five segments. Like all heteropterans, jewel bugs are characterized by a segmented beak-like mouthpart (known as the rostrum). During feeding, jewel bugs inject proteolytic enzymes in their saliva into plants, digesting plant matter into a liquid form which they then suck up. The tarsus has three segments (tarsomeres).

Colors
Though some species are quite drab, the most conspicuous jewel bugs are often brilliantly colored, exhibiting a wide range of iridescent metallic hues that change with the view angle. The colors are the result of a combination of factors. Some species like Chrysocoris stockerus and Scutellera nobilis display colors from multiple thin layers of pigmented chitin. The colors often change or become duller when the specimens are dried, due to the topmost chitinous layer becoming opaque and obscuring the colors of the bottom layer. The colors can be restored by moistening the surfaces with water.

Iridescence (or goniochromism) in jewel bugs like Poecilocoris lewisi are the result of structural coloration. Instead of pigments, the colors are caused by the interference, diffraction, or scattering of light by numerous tiny structures.

In Poecilocoris lewisi, multiple tiny conical protuberances around 900 nm in height and averaging at a diameter of 360 nm are scattered on the epicuticle. These structures affect light passing through them, producing their oily-looking blue sheen (known as the Tyndall effect or Mie scattering).

In other species like the African shield bug (Calidea panaethiopica), the dorsal cuticle is dotted with tiny regularly spaced hemispherical cavities. The depressions act like Bragg mirrors. When light hits the pitted surface, it gives off multiple reflections resulting in the distinctive two tone yellow-blue iridescence.

The colors and patterns on jewel bugs can vary significantly between instars and even within adults of a species.

Jewel bugs are also known to mimic the colors, patterns, and shape of other organisms for defensive purposes. An example is the yellow-spotted black Steganocerus multipunctatus which exhibits Müllerian mimicry with the tortoise beetle Chiridopsis suffriani.

Ecology and life cycle
All jewel bugs feed on plants (phytophagous). The eggs are laid in compact clusters. They may be round or barrel-shaped with a lid or a cap at the top (known as the operculum). They also contain a ring of small protuberances near the cap called micropylar processes. They permit the passage of sperm into the egg for fertilization and enable gaseous exchange from within the egg and the outside world for the embryos. The eggs are white or cream colored when freshly laid but can change color as the embryo matures. When hatching, the prolarva (the advanced embryo) exit the egg by opening the lid through peristaltic movements and with the help of a T-shaped internal structure in the egg (known as the egg burster).

Like all hemipterans, jewel bugs undergo incomplete metamorphosis (hemimetaboly) and do not possess larval and pupal stages. Instead the adults develop from several stages (instars) of nymphs (usually five) through successive moltings (ecdysis). Nymphs resemble the adults except for size and the absence of wings. They can be of different coloration or patterns from adults.

Some species are known to exhibit parental care of eggs and nymphs. Notable examples of which are Cantao parentum, Pachycoris klugii, Pachycoris stalii, Pachycoris torridus, and Tectocoris diophthalmus.

Reproduction
Chemical secretions from dorsal abdominal or sternal exocrine glands are used to attract mates by certain species of jewel bugs. In certain genera (like Tectocoris, Psacasta, Odontoscelis, and Irochrotus), males possess special unicellular glands in the abdomen known as the androconia (singular: androconium). They release sex pheromones when ruptured.

Females possess a spermatheca, an ectodermal gland which opens into the oviduct. These serve as storage for sperm deposited by males. It contains glands which can nourish the spermatozoa until they can be released to fertilize eggs.

Male jewel bugs of the genus Hotea possess an unusually large, spiky, and heavily sclerotized genitalia. They are used in a mating practice known as traumatic insemination, a result of evolutionary sexual conflict. Male Hotea bugs tear through the female reproductive ducts to deposit sperm, inflicting substantial damage to the female in the process.

Defenses
Like stink bugs, a vast majority of jewel bugs, both adults and nymphs, are also capable of releasing pungent defensive chemicals from glands located on the sides of the thorax. Typical compounds exuded by jewel bugs include alcohols, aldehydes, and esters.

Nymphs and adults often exhibit clustering behavior, being found in large numbers close to each other. This behavior is thought to have an evolutionary advantage. The more individuals present in an area, the stronger the odor of the chemicals released when the bugs are threatened. If this fails, stink bugs will react to threat by flying away or dropping to the ground.

Classification and evolution
Scutellerids were first described by the English zoologist William Elford Leach in 1815. It belongs to the order Hemiptera (true bugs), under the suborder Heteroptera and infraorder Pentatomomorpha. They are classified under the superfamily Pentatomoidea. They were formerly classified as a subfamily of Pentatomidae by George Willis Kirkaldy in 1909. The earliest attempt to restore them to family status was in 1917 by Edward Payson Van Duzee. Most authorities today regard it as a valid family group.
In phylogenetic studies in 2008 by Grazia et al., Scutelleridae was shown to be consistently monophyletic, basal to Acanthosomatidae, and distal to Plataspididae and Parastrachiidae. Below is the morphological unweighted tree of the superfamily Pentatomoidea after Grazia et al. (2008).

Subfamilies and genera
The family is composed of about 81 genera and around 450 species worldwide. While the tribal and subfamilial classifications remain unclear, they are divided into eight subfamilies sensu lato: Elvisurinae, Eurygastrinae, Hoteinae (sometimes classified under Pachycorinae), Odontoscelinae, Odontotarsinae, Pachycorinae, Scutellerinae, and Tectocorinae.

 Elvisurinae
Austrotichus Gross, 1975 
Coleotichus White, 1839 
Elvisura Spinola, 1837 
Solenosthedium Spinola, 1837 
Solenotichus Martin, 1897
 Eurygastrinae Amyot & Audinet-Serville, 1843 
Euptychodera
Eurygaster Laporte de Castelnau, 1833
Fokkeria
Phimodera
Vanduzeeina
  Hoteinae
Deroplax Mayr, 1864 
Ellipsocoris Mayr, 1864 
Hotea Amyot & Serville, 1843
 Odontotarsinae Mulsant & Rey, 1865 
Ahmadocoris Carapezza, 2009 
Alphocoris Germar, 1830 
Melanodema Jakovlev, 1880 
Odontotarsiellus Hoberlandt, 1955 
Odontotarsus Laporte, 1833 
Urothyreus Horváth, 1921
 Pachycorinae Amyot & Audinet-Serville, 1843 
Acantholomidea
Camirus
Diolcus
Homaemus
Orsilochides
Pachycoris
Sphyrocoris
Stethaulax
Symphylus
Tetyra
 Scutellerinae Leach, 1815 
Augocoris
Calliphara
Cantao
Chrysocoris
Lampromicra
Sphaerocoris
 Tectocorinae McDonald & Cassis, 1984 (monotypic)
Tectocoris Hahn, 1834

Economic significance

Though most jewel bugs do little harm to crop plants, a few members of Scutelleridae are considered major agricultural pests. Together with some species of stink bugs, they are collectively known as sunn pests (also spelled as senn, or shüne pests) or wheat bugs. The most economically important species of which are members of the genus Eurygaster.

Eurygaster integriceps, in particular, is a very destructive pest of cereal crops in  North Africa, the Balkans, and western and central Asia. Other scutellerids known under the name 'sunn pest' include members of the genus Odontotarsus, among others. Methods of control for sunn pests have included biological pest control, using wasps of the family Scelionidae from the genera Trissolcus and Ooencyrtus.

The cotton harlequin bug (Tectocoris diophthalmus) is also an important pest of cotton crops and Hibiscus.

Conservation
Biological methods of pest control have sometimes backfired. A parasitoid fly which preys on hemipterans, Trichopoda pennipes was introduced to Hawaii to control the invasive species Nezara viridula, the southern green stink bug. The fly now threatens native species of bugs in Hawaii as well, particularly the Koa bug (Coleotichus blackburniae, a jewel bug species notable for not possessing stink glands) which has now become rare.

Gallery

See also
 Sunn pest

References

External links

 A gallery of Scutellerid photos from Flickr

 
Agricultural pest insects
Heteroptera families
Shield bugs
Taxa named by William Elford Leach